Martin Damm and David Prinosil were the defending champions but only Damm competed that year with Cyril Suk.

Damm and Suk lost in the semifinals to Wayne Black and Kevin Ullyett.

Black and Ullyett won in the final 3–6, 6–3, 7–5 against Bob Bryan and Mike Bryan.

Seeds
The top four seeded teams received byes into the second round.

Draw

Final

Top half

Bottom half

External links
 2002 Legg Mason Tennis Classic Doubles draw

2002 ATP Tour